The 1998–99 Argentine Primera B Nacional was the 13th season of second division professional of football in Argentina. A total of 33 teams competed; the champion and runner-up were promoted to Argentine Primera División.

Club information

Interior Zone

Metropolitana Zone

Interior Zone standings

Metropolitana Zone Standings

Promotion Playoff
The Promotion Playoff was played by the teams placed 1st and 2nd of each zone. The winning team was declared champion and was automatically promoted to Primera División. The teams that lost in semifinal joined into the Round of 16 of the Second Promotion Playoff, and the team that lost in the final joined in the Quarterfinals of the Second Promotion Playoff.

Semifinals

|-
!colspan="5"|Semifinals

|-
!colspan="5"|Semifinals

1: Qualified because of sport advantage.

Final

|-
!colspan="5"|Final

Second Promotion Playoff
The Second Promotion Playoff or Torneo Reducido was played by the teams placed 3rd to 14th of each zone. Arsenal and Atlético Tucumán joined in the Round of 16, and Chacarita Juniors joined in the Quarterfinals. The winner was promoted to Primera División.

Bracket

1: Qualified because of sport advantage.
Note: The team in the first line plays at home the second leg.

Relegation
Note: Clubs with indirect affiliation with AFA are relegated to the Torneo Argentino A, while clubs directly affiliated face relegation to Primera B Metropolitana. Clubs with direct affiliation are all from Greater Buenos Aires, with the exception of Newell's, Rosario Central, Central Córdoba and Argentino de Rosario, all from Rosario, and Unión and Colón from Santa Fe.

Interior Zone

Metropolitana Zone

Promotion/relegation playoff
Teams placed 15th and 16th of the Relegation Table Interior Zone (Huracán Corrientes and Douglas Haig), played a promotion/relegation playoff or Torneo Reclasificatorio, with General Paz Juniors and Villa Mitre, teams from Torneo Argentino A. The winner was Villa Mitre and was promoted to 1999–2000 Primera B Nacional. Huracán Corrientes and Douglas Haig were relegated to Torneo Argentino A and General Paz Juniors stayed on it.

Semifinals

Final

See also
1998–1999 in Argentine football

References

External links

Primera B Nacional seasons
Prim
1998 in South American football leagues
1999 in South American football leagues